Mediaset Italia is an international linguistic and cultural television channel, part of the Italian media company Mediaset. Launched in 2009 with the aim to reach Italian communities worldwide, the channel is the international service of Mediaset and broadcast entertainment programming from Canale 5, Italia 1 and Rete 4.

On June 15, 2011, Mediaset Italia officially launched in the United States, available via Dish Network and Comcast. Since September 20, 2017 the channel was also available via DirecTV.

Programming

TV Series and Soap Operas
Amore pensaci tu
Centovetrine
Dottor Clown
Fuoco amico TF45 - Eroe per amore
Furore - Il vento della speranza
I piccoli maestri
Il bello delle donne - alcuni anni dopo
L'onore e il rispetto
La regina di Palermo
Le tre rose di Eva
R.I.S Roma
Rimbocchiamoci le maniche
Romanzo siciliano
Solo
Squadra Antimafia
Tutti insieme all'improvviso
Un cane per due
Un dottore quasi perfetto
Vivere

News and Infotainment
Stasera Italia
Striscia la notizia
Battiti Live
Matrix
Quarto grado
Quarta Repubblica
Dritto e Rovescio
Freedom - Oltre il confine
CR4 - La repubblica delle donne
Segreti e delitti
Studio Aperto
Terra!
TG5
TG4

Entertainment
 Amici
 Avanti un altro!
 Big Show
 Caduta libera
 Colorado
 Ciao Darwin
 Chi ha incastrato Peter Pan?
 C'è posta per te
 Cotto e mangiato
 Domenica Cinque
 Forum
 Grande Fratello
 Le Iene Show
 Lo sportello di Forum
 Live - Non è la D'Urso
 L'isola dei famosi
 Mattino Cinque
 Melaverde
 Pomeriggio Cinque
 Ricette di famiglia
 Ti racconto un libro
 Temptation Island
 The Call Trasformat
 Uomini e Donne
 Verissimo
 Vite straordinarie
 Zelig
 I viaggi del cuore

See also
 Rai Italia

References

External links
 
 Mediaset Italia at Mediaset Distribution

Mediaset television channels
International broadcasters
Television channels and stations established in 2009
2009 establishments in Croatia
Italian-language television stations